Karen Paullada is a Welsh actress who has worked extensively in television and theatre roles. She is best known for playing Nadine in the Sky1 TV comedy drama series Stella.

Filmography

TV

References

External links
 

Living people
Welsh television actresses
People from Bridgend County Borough
1980 births